The Best is the first compilation album by Greek singer Despina Vandi, including recordings from her albums released by Minos EMI. It was made available in Greek market in early December 2001 and it went Gold.

Track listing

Music videos
"Katalliles Proipothesis" (feat. Giorgos Lembesis)

Release history

2001 greatest hits albums
Albums produced by Phoebus (songwriter)
Despina Vandi compilation albums
Greek-language compilation albums
Minos EMI compilation albums